Callicera rufa is a Palearctic hoverfly.

Description
For terms see Morphology of Diptera
External images
A large (Wing length 9·75-11·25 mm.) metallic fly  with red fur and long black antennae. Antennae segment 1 at least twice as long as 2 with a short arista (more so in male) which is bulbous at the base, then thread-like. The tergites are shining black, 2 and 3 with dull blackish markings The pubescence of tergites entirely tawny red (tergite 4 is more or less extensively black-haired in some individuals). The legs are  yellow-red, the last two tarsal segments darkened.

The larva is illustrated in colour by Rotheray.

Distribution
Scotland, Belgium, Netherlands, Germany, Poland, Hungary, Balaearic islands, Pyrenees, Corsica, Italy, Greece, and Romania. Not known from the east Palaearctic.

Habitat
Ancient Pinus sylvestris forest.

Biology
Arboreal, but females descend to visit stumps of old pine trees in small forest clearings, or to visit rot-holes. Flowers visited include Ranunculus repens. The flight period is mid May to August.

References

Palearctic arthropods
Eristalinae
Taxa named by Theodor Emil Schummel